Kim Hye-sung (also spelt Kim Hye-seong; born January 14, 1988) is a South Korean actor and model.

Biography
Kim Hye-sung is a South Korean actor under NAMOOACTORS. In March 2012, Kim Hye-sung enlisted for his mandatory military service at the 306 Reserve in Uijeongbu, Gyeonggi Province and was discharged in March 2013. He is popular and well known for his leading  role as Juno in Jenny, Juno (2006).

Filmography

Film

Television

References

External links

1988 births
Living people
Male actors from Seoul
South Korean male television actors
South Korean male film actors
South Korean male models
South Korean Buddhists